The Macedonian Orthodox Cathedral of the Dormition of the Virgin Mary (Makedonska Pravoslavna Katedralna Crkva "Uspenie na Presveta Bogorodica) is a Macedonian Orthodox cathedral church located in Sydenham, a suburb of northwestern Melbourne, Victoria, Australia.

History
In 1994, efforts to establish a church presence in the western suburbs of Melbourne by the local Macedonian community were led by Vlado Trpčevski, Zdravko Talevski, Ico Najdovski, Tode Milenkovski and Trajče Atanasovski. A letter was received by the Macedonian Holy Synod from the community which called for acceptance of the proposal and the future appointment of a priest to serve the congregation. The initiative was welcomed by the Macedonian Holy Synod and approved through a letter sent in February 1995. 

Opposition to the church came from the priest at St. Ilija in Footscray, the Bishop's deputy Father Jovica Simonovski, and the committee of the church. Ico Najdovski states it was improbable, however citing Vlado Trpčevski, he describes that the opposition by the Bishop's deputy to another new church in Melbourne's western suburbs was over a possible fall in the priest's income.

In the suburb of St. Albans and the surrounding area, the Macedonian community placed strong pressure on Petar, the Metropolitan for Australia and New Zealand to support efforts for a new church at Lot 4 on Sydenham Rd in Sydenham and to consecrate it. Metropolitan Petar consecrated the church in October 1996 with other priests from Victoria  co-servicing at the event. 

In April 2016, the church hall and shed were burned down in a fire considered suspicious by local authorities.

See also 

 Macedonian Australians

References

External links 
Facebook

Macedonian Orthodox churches in Melbourne
Macedonian-Australian culture
Buildings and structures in the City of Brimbank
Religious buildings and structures completed in 1996
1996 establishments in Australia